Otelfingen is a railway station in Switzerland. The station is situated in the municipality of Otelfingen. The station is located on the Furttal railway line between Wettingen and Zürich Oerlikon stations.

Otelfingen is a stop of the Zurich S-Bahn served by trains on line S6, which operate twice-hourly to and from Zürich Hauptbahnhof, with a journey time of just under 30 minutes. The station is linked to the villages of Otelfingen and Boppelsen by Glattalbus bus route 450, which operates twice-hourly on Monday through Saturday.

Otelfingen was the junction for the former Niederglatt-Otelfingen railway line, which once connected with Niederglatt station on the Bülach branch of the Bülach-Regensberg Railway but closed to through trains in 1937. A short stretch of the line has been retained as a siding, and joins the main line just to the east of the station.

References

External links 
 

Railway stations in the canton of Zürich
Swiss Federal Railways stations